Donemus (compounded from Documentatiecentrum nederlandse muziek) is the Dutch institute dealing with the documentation of contemporary music composed in the Netherlands. 

Originally a publisher of scores, between 1960 and 2000 Donemus also published a series of recordings titled Composers' Voice (CV); initially on LP, and later on CD. The originally large archive of hand-written scores was sent back to the composers in the early 21st century; today the archive is maintained mainly digitally.

See also
Gaudeamus Foundation

External links
Donemus website

Music archives
Organisations based in Amsterdam
Sheet music publishing companies
Music organisations based in the Netherlands